Die Beste Band der Welt (...und zwar live) (The best band in the world (... live)) are the second and third VHS and the fifth DVD by German rock band Die Ärzte. The DVD is the sampler of the 1988 VHS "Die Beste Band der Welt (...und zwar live) (part 1)" and the 1989 VHS "Die Beste Band der Welt (...und zwar live) (part 2)".

The video features many songs written especially to be played live, such as "Madonnas Dickdarm", "Claudia III" and the instrumental "Der Ritt auf dem Schmetterling".
The video is based on the Munich concert from 26 April 1988.

Track list
Die Beste Band der Welt (...und zwar live) (part 1)
 Ouvertüre zum besten Konzert der Welt [Overture to the best concert in the world] – 1:34
 Radio brennt [Radio burns] – 2:26
 Ohne Dich [Without you] – 2:02
 Blumen [Flowers] – 3:01
 Buddy Holly's Brille [Buddy Holly's glasses] – 3:48
 Madonnas Dickdarm [Madonna's colon] – 1:53
 Alleine in der Nacht [Alone in the night] – 2:31
 2000 Mädchen [2,000 girls] – 2:51
 Mysteryland – 3:24
 Westerland – 3:41
 El Cattivo [Bad (in Italian)] – 2:46
 Außerirdische [Alien] – 2:16
 Du willst mich küssen [You want to kiss me] – 2:59
 Ist das alles? [Is that all?] – 3:05
 Zu spät [Too late] – 3:55
 Teenager Liebe (in the credits) [Teenager love] – 2:36

''Die Beste Band der Welt (...und zwar live) (part 2) Helmut K. [Helmut Kohl] – 2:11
 Sweet sweet Gwendoline – 2:04
 Gute Zeit [Have a nice time] – 2:56
 Elke – 3:53
 Claudia III – 4:58
 Der Ritt auf dem Schmetterling [The ride on the butterfly] – 4:05
 Videoclip: Gehn wie ein Ägypter
 Videoclip: Westerland
 Videoclip: Bitte bitte
 Making of: Bitte bitte
 Wie am ersten Tag (in the credits) [Like on the first day] – 2:51Die Beste Band der Welt (...und zwar live)'' (DVD)
 Ouvertüre zum besten Konzert der Welt [Overture to the best concert in the world] – 1:34
 Radio brennt [Radio burns] – 2:26
 Ohne Dich [Without you] – 2:02
 Blumen [Flowers] – 3:01
 Buddy Holly's Brille [Buddy Holly's glasses] – 3:48
 Madonnas Dickdarm [Madonna's colon] – 1:53
 Alleine in der Nacht [Alone in the night] – 2:31
 2000 Mädchen [2000 girls] – 2:51
 Mysteryland – 3:24
 Westerland – 3:41
 El Cattivo [Bad (in Italian)] – 2:46
 Außerirdische [Alien] – 2:16
 Du willst mich küssen [You want to kiss me] – 2:59
 Ist das alles? [Is that all?] – 3:05
 Zu spät [Too late] – 3:55
 Helmut K. [Helmut Kohl] – 2:11
 Sweet sweet Gwendoline – 2:04
 Gute Zeit [Have a nice time] – 2:56
 Elke – 3:53
 Claudia III – 4:58
 Der Ritt auf dem Schmetterling [The ride on the butterfly] – 4:05
Bonus videos
 Video clip: Gehn wie ein Ägypter
 Video clip: Westerland
 Video clip: Bitte bitte
 Making of: Bitte bitte (Nein Danke!) [Please please – No thank you!]

Song information 
VHS 1
Track 16 from the EP Zu schön, um wahr zu sein!
Track 11,15 from the album Debil
Track 5,13 from the album Im Schatten der Ärzte
Track 7,9,14 from the album Die Ärzte
Track 2,8 from the album Ist das alles? (13 Höhepunkte mit den Ärzten)
Track 3,4,10,12 from the album Das ist nicht die ganze Wahrheit...
VHS 2
Track 2 from the album Die Ärzte
Track 1 from the album Ab 18
Track 3,4 from the album Das ist nicht die ganze Wahrheit...
New songs
"Ouvertüre zum besten Konzert der Welt"
"Madonnas Dickdarm"
"Claudia III"
"Der Ritt auf dem Schmetterling"

Die Ärzte video albums
1988 video albums
1989 video albums
Live video albums
1988 live albums
1989 live albums